The Château de Saint-Élix is a 16th-century castle in the commune of Saint-Élix-le-Château in the Haute-Garonne département of France.

Built in the 1540s, it is privately owned and has been listed since 1927 as a monument historique by the French Ministry of Culture. Of note are the orangery, stables, walls and pigeon loft.

See also
List of castles in France

References

External links
 

Châteaux in Haute-Garonne
Monuments historiques of Haute-Garonne